5,6-Dibromo-N-methyltryptamine (5,6-Dibromo-NMT) is a substituted tryptamine alkaloid that occurs naturally in marine sponges.

See also 
5,6-Dibromotryptamine
6-Bromotryptamine
5-Bromo-DMT

References 

Tryptamine alkaloids
Bromoarenes